Understanding Phonology is a textbook by Carlos Gussenhoven and Haike Jacobs designed for an introductory course in phonology for students with no prior knowledge.

Reception
The book was reviewed by Alain Thériault, Elizabeth Hume, Jeff Mielke, Ken Lodge and David Deterding.

References 

1998 non-fiction books
Phonology books
Linguistics textbooks
Routledge books